No Way Back is a 1953 West German drama film directed by Victor Vicas and starring Ivan Desny, Ruth Niehaus and René Deltgen. It was made at the height of the Cold War.

In 1945 following the Battle of Berlin, a Red Army officer is able to protect a young German woman he finds living in a cellar. Several years later he returns to the city as a civilian, finds her again and makes plans to flee from East to West Germany under the noses of the KGB.

Cast
 Ivan Desny as Michael Zorin aka Mischa
 Ruth Niehaus as Anna Brückner
 René Deltgen as Major Kazanow
 Karl John as Friedrich Schultz
 Lila Kedrova as Ljuba
 Serge Beloussow as Litvinski
 Leonid Pylajew as Wassilij
 Alf Marholm as Direktor Berger
 Erika Dannhoff
 John Haggerty as Steve McCullough
 Wolfgang Neuss as Comedian
 Herbert von Boxberger
 Bogislav von Heyden
 Reinhard Kolldeh

References

Bibliography
 Bock, Hans-Michael & Bergfelder, Tim. The Concise Cinegraph: Encyclopaedia of German Cinema. Berghahn Books, 2009.

External links 
 

1953 films
1953 drama films
German drama films
West German films
1950s German-language films
Films directed by Victor Vicas
Films set in Berlin
Films set in 1945
Cold War films
German black-and-white films
1950s German films